Wang Xuemeng (born 20 October 1993) is a Chinese basketball player. She represented China at the 2018 FIBA Women's Basketball World Cup.

References

External links

Living people
1993 births
Basketball players from Xinjiang
Chinese women's basketball players
Forwards (basketball)
Bayi Kylin players
People from Korla
Asian Games medalists in basketball
Basketball players at the 2018 Asian Games
Asian Games gold medalists for China
Medalists at the 2018 Asian Games